Berberis dictyophylla, the netleaf barberry, is a deciduous shrub in the genus Berberis which is native to Western China (Qinghai, Sichuan, Tibet, Yunnan).

Berberis dictyophylla grows to 150 cm in height. The young shoots are covered in a white bloom and bear branching spines.  The obovate leaves turn red or yellow in Autumn. The plant bears solitary pale yellow flowers. Berries egg-shaped, reddish, often with a white bloom, up to 15 mm long. It grows in many habitats including forests, mountain slopes, thickets, and roadsides.

References

External links
photo of herbarium specimen at Missouri Botanical Garden, collected in Yunnan

dictyophylla
Flora of China
Plants described in 1889
Taxa named by Adrien René Franchet